Abdelrahman Ramadan Fetori (born 2 July 1984) is a Libyan footballer.

Honours 
Libya
Winner
 African Nations Championship: 2014

External links 
 

1984 births
Living people
Libyan footballers
Libya international footballers
Association football defenders
Libya A' international footballers
2014 African Nations Championship players